Electric Angel is the fourth album by Fiona Sit, and was released on August 11, 2006. A special edition was released on December 22, 2006.

Track listing

  (Tong But Lut)
  (Little Canyon 1234)
  (Fight)
  (Tree Ent)
 Dear Fiona 
  (Poinciana)
  (Sleep Walk)
  (Fox, Are you Happy?)
  (Floating Snow) (Mandarin Version of Tong But Lut) 
  (To Me 10 Years Later)
  (Song of the Society)

Extras on the special edition:
  (Thank You Earth)
  (Little Canyon 1234 Remix)

2006 albums
Fiona Sit albums